Aleksandr Sergeyev (born 29 July 1983 in Tver Oblast) is a Russian triple jumper. His personal best jump is 17.11 metres, first achieved in July 2004 in Cheboksary. He has a better indoor result with 17.23 metres from February 2004 in Moscow.

Achievements

References

External links 

1983 births
Living people
Russian male triple jumpers
Universiade medalists in athletics (track and field)
Universiade gold medalists for Russia
Medalists at the 2005 Summer Universiade
Sportspeople from Tver Oblast